East Bay is a region of the San Francisco Bay Area in Northern California.

East Bay may also refer to:

Places

Antarctica
East Bay (Antarctica), a small bay indenting the east portion of Prince Olav Harbor, South Georgia Island

Canada
East Bay, Nova Scotia, a small town
East Bay (Nova Scotia), the east arm of the Bras d'Or Lake
East Bay (Nunavut), a waterway in the Kivalliq Region

United Kingdom
East Bay (Argyll and Bute), a bay in Scotland

United States
East Bay (Santa Rosa County, Florida), connected to Pensacola Bay
East Bay (Bay County, Florida), off St. Andrews Bay in the Panama City area
East Bay River, Florida
East Bay Township, Michigan
East Bay (Michigan), an arm of Grand Traverse Bay
East Bay (New York), a lagoon on the south shore of Long Island
East Bay (Rhode Island)
East Bay (Texas), part of Galveston Bay

Other uses
 California State University, East Bay
 Eastbay, a direct mail catalog and Internet apparel company
 East Bay Express, a weekly newspaper based in Oakland, California

See also
 East Bay Ray (born 1958), lead guitarist for the Dead Kennedys
 Eastern Bay, Maryland, an estuary of the Chesapeake Bay
 North Bay (disambiguation)
 South Bay (disambiguation)
 Tung Wan (disambiguation)
 West Bay (disambiguation)